Edward Francis Jeffers (December 6, 1921 – April 4, 2010) was a professional American football guard. He was a member of the Brooklyn Dodgers.

He served his country in the United States Army during World War II in the Pacific. He was the recipient of the Distinguished Service Cross, Silver Star with Clusters, Bronze Star Medal with Clusters and two Purple Hearts. He was discharged as a sergeant.

He graduated from McAlester High School in the Class of 1939. He later graduated from Oklahoma State University, where he played football. After graduation, he played professional football with the Brooklyn Dodgers.

He married Leota Curliss in 1950, in Hartshorne. He was an educator for more than 35 years and was the football coach at Hartshorne in the 1950s. He taught and was a football coach at Houston Junior High for 32 years in Hobbs, New Mexico.  He and his wife raised 4 sons.

References

People from Hartshorne, Oklahoma
Brooklyn Dodgers (AAFC) players
American football offensive guards
Oklahoma Sooners football players
Oklahoma State Cowboys football players
1921 births
2010 deaths
Recipients of the Silver Star
Recipients of the Distinguished Service Cross (United States)
United States Army non-commissioned officers
United States Army personnel of World War II